Brendan McCormack (born 28 June 1970) is a former Australian rules footballer who played with Fitzroy and the Brisbane Bears in the AFL during the early 1990s.

External links

1970 births
Living people
Australian rules footballers from Victoria (Australia)
Brisbane Bears players
Fitzroy Football Club players